In inorganic chemistry, the sulfuryl group is a functional group consisting of a sulfur atom covalently bound to two oxygen atoms. 

It occurs in compounds such as sulfuryl chloride,  and sulfuryl fluoride, .

In organic chemistry, this group is found in sulfones and sulfonyl halides, where it is called the sulfonyl group.

References

 
Functional groups